Kalabhushana Ramya Wanigasekara (born 17 July) [Sinhala]), is an actress in Sri Lankan cinema, theater and television. One of the earliest pillars of Sri Lankan radio, she worked as a news reader for more than two decades. Apart from acting, Wanigasekara also became a news reader and vocalist at the Radio Ceylon as well as a playback singer.

Personal life
She was born on 17 July 1936 in Kotiyakumbura, Kegalle as the fifth child in a family with seven siblings. Her father from Hettimulla, Kegalle was an estate superintendent and mother was from Eheliyagoda. Ramya has two elder sisters, two elder brothers and two younger brothers. She started primary education from Ampe Maha Vidyalaya, Kotiyakumbura. After attending to many schools, she completed education finally from Ruwanwella Royal College.

Wanigasekara was married to popular dramatist Ranasinghe Rajapakse Samarakoon (popularly as R. R. Samarakoon). Samarakoon was born on 14 August 1939 in Dekinda village, Nawalapitiya. He started primary education from St Andrew's Girls College, Nawalapitiya and secondary education from Kingswood College, Kandy. Samarakoon died on 2010.

The affair started during the stage play Kelani Palama. The couple has one daughter, Buddhika Mudithani. Buddhika acted in Kelani Palama in little age as "Surangani". She excelled at stage costume designing.

Career
She entered the drama as a stage playback singer with the 1974 stage play Hewayo produced by Chandi Gunathilake. After that she became the background singer in many stage plays produced by Jayatissa Alahakoon. In 1976, she first acted in Ranjith Dharmakeerthi's play Hasthiraja Mahaththaya with a minor role. After that she got the opportunity to sing background songs for Dharmakeerthi's play Angara Ganga Gala Basi under the music composition by Premasiri Khemadasa. She also acted in that play in some accidental moments.

In 1978, her breakthrough in stage drama came through the play Mana Ranjana Weda Warjana directed by Chula Kariyawasam with the role "Gunawathi". At that time veteran actress Chandra Kaluarachchi was pregnant, where her role "Matilda" in Kelani Palama was given to Wanigasekara by producer and future husband R. R. Samarakoon. Then, she acted in Samarakoon's plays Ahasin Watunu Minissu (1971), Idama (1975), Jailer Unnahe (1986), Doowili (1990) and Raja Kathawa (1991). Later she acted in a number of popular plays including Sanda Kinduri, Muhudu Puththu, Ma Hene Reeri Yaka,Liyathambara, Siri Sangabo and Hiru Nathi Lowa. She played the role "Matilda" in Kelani Palama for 41 consecutive years.

In 1980, she joined Radio Ceylon to host the program Thakshilawa. The program contained poetry, singing, drama, and news. Since 1981 she has been a regular news anchor until retired in 2006. Later, in 2008 she worked on a contract basis in Sri Lanka Broadcasting Corporation and still worked as a relief newscaster. She is also Radio A-Grade Nurti singer.

In 1983, Wanigasekara was also a member of the first drama group of Dharmasena Pathiraja's documentary Gangulen Egodata on epilepsy. The play won a gold medal at a documentary competition in Germany. Later, she acted in many critically acclaimed roles in popular television serials such as Kande Gedara, Palingu Menike, Menik Nadiya Gala Basi, Denuwara Menike, Paba, Aluth Gedara and comedy sitcom Yes Boss. Her role in Dhamma Jagoda's Palingu Menike became her milestone in teledrama career.

On 26 October 2019, the 40th Anniversary of the stage play Kelani Palama was celebrated at the Panibharatha Hall of the University of the Aesthetics at 3.30 pm with the title 40 Wasaraka Rangabhinandanaya. The play was first staged on October 25, 1978 at the Lumbini Theater.  In 2019, The Janabhimani or Hela Maha Rawana Rajabhimani Awards Ceremony was held at the Jasmine Auditorium at the BMICH where Wanigasekara won the Best Service Award.

Selected television serials

 Ahankara Nagarae 
 Ahas Gawwa 
 Aluth Gedara
 Amarabandu Rupasinghe
 Ammavarune
 Chandi Kumarihami 
 Denuwara Menike
 Diyaniyo 
 Indi Vata Addara 
 Kande Gedara 
 Koombiyo
 Maunayagaya
 Menik Nadiya Gala Basi 
 Nenala <ref>{{cite web |url=http://www.sarasaviya.lk/teledramas/2020/09/24/19033/නාලන්ගේ-නෑනලා-රූපවාහිනියට-එති |title=Nalan's 'Nenala come on TV |publisher=Sarasaviya |access-date=24 September 2017}}</ref>
 Palingu Menike Paba Pehesara Rathu Ahasa 
 Salsapuna Sikuru Wasanthe 
 Thurya 
 Yes BossFilmography

Awards
Wanigasekara has won several awards at many local award festivals.

State Awards

|-
|| 1991 ||| Kande Gedara || Popular woman on stage and teledrama || 
|-
|| 1993 |||  || Most Popular Actress || 

OCIC Awards

|-
|| 1994 ||| Kande Gedara || Most Popular Actress || 

State Drama Festival

|-
|| 1995 ||| Lihini || Best Supporting Actress || 

Other Awards

|-
|| 1990 ||| Lankadeepa Vijaya Awards || Most Popular Actress || 
|-
|| 1991 ||| Lankadeepa Vijaya Awards || Most Popular Actress || 
|-
|| 2009 |||  || Liya Varuna Award || 
|-
|| 2010 ||| Paba || ITN Award || 
|-
|| 2010 ||| Contribution to drama || Kalabhushana Award || 

Presidential Awards

|-
|| 1994/95 ||| News Reading'' || Best News Anchor ||

Sumathi Awards

|-
|| 2003 |||  ||  ||

Raigam Tele'es

|-
|| 2013 ||| Contribution to television || National Award ||

References

External links
 I am a Kandyan woman
 ප්‍රේමය සාර්ථක වෙන්නට නම් දෙදෙනාටම ඉවසීම තියෙන්න ඕනේ - රම්‍යා වනිගසේකර
 An Earful !
 Kelani Palama in town

1936 births
Sri Lankan film actresses
Sinhalese actresses
20th-century Sri Lankan actresses
21st-century Sri Lankan actresses
Living people